Sirat may refer to:

Ṣirāṭ, an Arabic word meaning 'way' or 'path'
Sīrat, an Arabic word meaning 'conduct', used to refer to a literary genre
Sirat, Algeria

See also
Sira (disambiguation)
Sirah (disambiguation)